Regius Professor of Greek may refer to:

 Regius Professor of Greek (Cambridge), at the University of Cambridge (founded 1540)
 Regius Professor of Greek (Oxford), at the University of Oxford (founded 1546)
 Regius Professor of Greek (Dublin), at Trinity College Dublin (founded 1761)